Monodonta vermiculata, common name the toothed topshell, is a species of sea snail, a marine gastropod mollusk in the family Trochidae, the top snails.

Description
The height of the shell attains , its diameter . The imperforate, solid, thick shell is subglobose. The short spire is conoid. The shell contains 4 to 5 whorls. The penultimate and last whorl are quite convex, the last descending, more or less concave just below the linear suture. The young shells are obsoletely spirally lirate, their sculpture disappearing with age. The coloration consists of numerous narrow red or orange zones alternating with bands of light green articulated with black. The oblique aperture is round-ovate. The outer lip is finely plicate within. The basal lip is thickened and plicate. The short columella terminates in an acute tooth. The middle of the columellar area contains a longitudinal semilunar groove, frequently irregularly curved. The basal notch or canal is oblique, squarish, wider than deep, and not denticulate in the middle.

There is great variation in color in this species. In some specimens red predominates, in others green. And often the general effect is an olive shade. There is usually a subsutural series of light and dark dashes. The numerous narrow red spiral lines are characteristic.

Distribution
This species occurs in the Red Sea, off Socotra and Muscat

References

 Donald K.M., Kennedy M. & Spencer H.G. (2005) The phylogeny and taxonomy of austral monodontine topshells (Mollusca: Gastropoda: Trochidae), inferred from DNA sequences. Molecular Phylogenetics and Evolution 37: 474–483

External links

vermiculata
Gastropods described in 1874